The Castiles were a rock and roll band that featured vocalist/guitarist/harmonica player Bruce Springsteen, and was formed by guitarist/vocalist George Theiss, with various lineups during its existence. They recorded two songs, and performed throughout New Jersey and New York before disbanding in 1968.

Springsteen went on to a successful recording and touring career, while Theiss was in various New Jersey bands, none that earned notoriety. Theiss died on July 13, 2018.

History
In 1964, Theiss saw the Beatles perform on The Ed Sullivan Show, and decided to form a band called the Castiles, named after the shampoo brand he was using at the time. He was romantically interested in Springsteen's sister, Virginia, and when Theiss would go to her house, her brother was playing guitar. Theiss asked Springsteen to join the Castiles in 1965 as lead guitarist. They were students at Freehold High School at the time.

"I was sitting in my South Street home one afternoon when a knock came at our front door," Springsteen wrote in his autobiography Born to Run. "It was George Theiss, a local guitarist and singer who’d heard through my sister that I played the guitar. I’d seen George around the Elks. He told me there was a band forming and they were looking for a lead guitarist. While I hesitated to call myself a lead guitarist, I had been hard at it for a while and worked up some very rudimentary 'chops.' We walked across town to Center Street and into a little half-shotgun house fifty feet up the block from where the metal-on-metal war of the rug mill spilled out open factory windows onto the streets of Texas. In Texas I'd slip on my guitar and join my first real band."

Theiss and Springsteen were joined in the Castiles by original members Paul Popkin, guitar/vocals; Frank Marziotti, bass; and Bart Haynes, drummer. When Haynes joined the army and fought in the Vietnam War, he was replaced by Vinny Maniello. Marziotti left, and Curt Fluhr became the bassist.

The Castiles practiced in half of a duplex home belonging to Haynes. Gordon "Tex" Vinyard lived in the other half of the two-family home, and he became the band's manager. They played gigs in local spots of Freehold from junior high school dances, roller rinks, drive-in theaters, supermarket openings, even clubs in the area and places like Cafe Wha? in Greenwich Village, and Asbury Park, New Jersey. They wore white pants, Beatle boots, and Beatle haircuts, and performed cover songs. 

The Castiles played their last show in August 1968 at the Off Broad Street Coffeehouse in Red Bank, New Jersey.

When the band disbanded in 1968 due to tension between Springsteen and Theiss, the two remained friends.

Recordings
In May 1966, Vinyard paid for a demo record made at Mr. Music in Toms River, New Jersey. These songs, "Baby I," and "That's What You Get," were both written by Theiss and Springsteen. The songs were finally released in 2016, on the album Chapter and Verse a companion album to Springsteen's Born to Run autobiography.

The Bruce Springsteen Story Vol. 1: The Castiles was released in 1993.

Of his 2020 album, Letter to You, Springsteen has said that the music was inspired by Theiss' death in 2018. Songs "Ghosts" and "Last Man Standing" were written by Springsteen because he was the last living member of The Castiles. Two other tracks with the same theme, "I'll See You in My Dreams" and "One Minute You're Here" were also included.

"The songs reminded me of a debt that I still owed to my Freehold brothers in arms," he said in the Thom Zimny-directed documentary, Bruce Springsteen's Letter to You, which aired on Apple TV+ in 2020. The doc includes Springsteen teaching his cousin to play The Castiles song "Baby I".

References

Rock music groups from New Jersey
Jersey Shore musical groups
Bruce Springsteen